Şampiyon (Champion) is the seventh studio album by Turkish-Belgian singer Hadise. It was released on 29 June 2017 by Pasaj Müzik. The album's first music video was released for the song "Şampiyon", and the song itself ranked second on the MusicTopTR Fastest Rising Chart in Turkey. Three other music videos were later released for the songs "Sıfır Tolerans", "Farkımız Var" and "Aşk Dediğin" respectively. Out of these songs, "Sıfır Tolerans" topped Turkey's official music chart while "Farkımız Var" rose to the sixth position. The music video for "Sıfır Tolerans" was later described as erotic by the Radio and Television Supreme Council and, as a result, the channels that had broadcast it were fined. Hadise, who described this decision as an act of patriarchy and sexism, commented on the issue by saying: "Our male artists have had numerous scenes with actresses/models and they do not fall into the category of 'erotic' at all. As a woman, do I have to submit to this? No. 'He's a man so he does whatever he likes, she's a woman so she stays quiet' I will fight with this mindset until the end". The music video for "Farkımız Var" received the Best Music Video award at the 45th Golden Butterfly Awards.

Track listing

Personnel 
 Production: Pasaj Müzik
 Producers: Hadise Açıkgöz, Hülya Açıkgöz
 General Coordinator: Hülya Açıkgöz
 Supervisor: İskender Paydaş
 Musical Assistant: Bilge Miraç Atıcı
 Vocal Coach: Youssef Chellak
 Vocal Recording: Barış Erduran
 Photographs: Emre Ünal
 Styling Consultant: Derya Açıkgöz
 Hair Stylist: Serkan Aktürk
 Make-up: Ali Rıza Özdemir
 Nail Art: Ebru Pırıl
 Design: Erhan Karadeniz
 Printing: Frs

Charts

References

External links 
Hadise official website

2017 albums
Hadise albums